Hector William Wilson (27 January 1924 – 15 May 2004) was a New Zealand rugby union player. A prop, Wilson represented  at a provincial level, and was a member of the New Zealand national side, the All Blacks, from 1949 to 1951. He played 13 matches for the All Blacks including five internationals.

References

1924 births
2004 deaths
New Zealand international rugby union players
New Zealand rugby union players
Otago rugby union players
Rugby union players from Otago
Rugby union props